Tashkalmashevo (Taşqalmaş) is a rural locality (a selo) in Chekmagushevsky District, Bashkortostan, Russia. The population was 240 as of 2010. There are 2 streets.

Geography 
Tashkalmashevo is located 22 km east of Chekmagush (the district's administrative centre) by road. Starokalmashevo is the nearest rural locality.

References 

Rural localities in Chekmagushevsky District